The 7.92×107mm DS was a Polish 7.92 mm anti-tank ammunition designed specifically for use with the karabin przeciwpancerny wz.35 anti-tank rifle. It was based on a standard 7.92×57mm Mauser cartridge, but was much longer (107 mm as opposed to the 57 mm of Mauser cartridge) and was modified to provide higher muzzle velocity and hence more penetrating power.

History

In the late 1920s, the Polish General Staff started the development of a light anti-tank weapon for the Polish infantry. In 1931, Lt. Colonel Tadeusz Felsztyn from the Institute of Armament Technology in Warsaw started the first tests of various low-calibre cartridges. After a series of tests, a new DS cartridge was proposed.

The DS ammunition was based on a standard 7.92 mm cartridge used by both the Mauser rifles and the Polish Karabinek wz. 29. After an additional series of tests, the initial copper coating was replaced with a coating made of brass (an alloy of 67% copper and 23% zinc).

See also
 Karabin przeciwpancerny wz.35
 Table of handgun and rifle cartridges

Notes

References
 
 
 
 

Pistol and rifle cartridges
Military cartridges
World War II military equipment of Poland
Military equipment of the interwar period

Anti-materiel cartridges